Stabio railway station is a railway station in the municipality of Stabio, in the Swiss canton of Ticino. It is an intermediate stop on the standard gauge Mendrisio–Varese line of Swiss Federal Railways.

Services
The following services stop at Stabio:

References

External links 
 
 

Railway stations in Ticino
Swiss Federal Railways stations